Star Cluster One is a play-by-mail game published by The Buchanan Company.

Gameplay
Star Cluster One was a game in which players build bases and ships to take over a star cluster recovering from a recent super-nova.

Reception
W.G. Armintrout reviewed Star Cluster One in The Space Gamer No. 48. Armintrout commented that "I'm not particularly pleased with Star Cluster One. In my opinion it could use a shot of action [...] and better handling by Buchanan. Right now it is a slow game with a long turn-around time - hardly the perfect combination. Not recommended."

References

Play-by-mail games